Robert L. Clarke (born June 29, 1942) was Comptroller of the Currency of the United States from 1985 to 1992. He was born in Tulsa, Oklahoma.

Robert L. Clarke, a Texas banking attorney, was named Comptroller by President Ronald Reagan. His tenure coincided with an era of extraordinary turbulence in financial institutions and the financial marketplace in the United States.

Under Clarke, the agency strengthened its managerial and supervisory capabilities to deal with changes and stresses in the national banking system. Clarke led the effort to expand the national bank powers to better meet the competition from non-bank providers of financial services. His leadership helped to reduce the costs of bank failures and to restore the safety and soundness of the national banking system. He returned to the practice of law after his term as Comptroller.

References

External links
 Bio at the Treasury Department

United States Comptrollers of the Currency
Comptrollers in the United States
Rice University alumni
Living people
1942 births
Reagan administration personnel
George H. W. Bush administration personnel